William Edward Libbis (2 July 1903 – 15 August 1986) was an Australian rules footballer who played with Collingwood and Melbourne in the Victorian Football League (VFL).

Family
William Edward Libbis was born in Port Melbourne, Victoria on 2 July 1903.

He married Stella Millicent Hannebery (1905-1961) in 1929.

Collingwood
Libbis was a rover and made his debut in 1925. He became a member of the successful Collingwood side which won four consecutive premierships from 1927 to 1930, Libbis the first rover for each grand final. Gordon Coventry called him "the best rover he ever saw".

In 1931, he was suspended for eight weeks for striking Ted Pool in the match against Hawthorn on 9 May 1931. Returning from his suspension, he only played in three matches before he was hospitalized and operated on for appendicitis. He did not play again that season.

Melbourne
At the beginning of the 1933 season Libbis protested against the player's weekly match payments being reduced and he was cleared to leave the club for Melbourne.

Northcote
Having transferred from being the coach of the State Savings Bank team in the Victorian Amateur Football Association (VAFA) in 1938, he served as coach of Northcote from 1939 to 1941 (the VFA was in recess due to World war II 1942-1944); he began his tenure as a non-playing coach, but soon returned to the field as a captain-coach.

Footnotes

References
 Holmesby, Russell & Main, Jim, The Encyclopedia of AFL Footballers: every AFL/VFL player since 1897 (9th ed.), (Melbourne), Bas Publishing, 2011. 
 Piesse, Ken, The Complete Guide to Australian Football, (Melbourne), Pan MacMillan Australia Pty Limited, 1993. 
 Ross, J. (ed), 100 Years of Australian Football 1897–1996: The Complete Story of the AFL, All the Big Stories, All the Great Pictures, All the Champions, Every AFL Season Reported, Viking, (Ringwood), 1996.

External links

 
 Biography: Billy Libbis 1925-1933, Collingwood Forever.
 Bill Libbis, Boyles Football Photos.
 Billy Libbis, Australian Football.com.
 Billy Libbis, Demonwiki.org.

1903 births
1986 deaths
Collingwood Football Club players
Collingwood Football Club Premiership players
Melbourne Football Club players
Northcote Football Club players
Northcote Football Club coaches
Australian rules footballers from Melbourne
Four-time VFL/AFL Premiership players
People from Port Melbourne